The Thirteen Buddhas of Anan（阿南十三佛霊場, Anan jūsan butsu reijō）are a group of 13 Buddhist sacred sites in Tokushima Prefecture, Japan. The temples are dedicated to the Thirteen Buddhas.

Directory

See also
 Thirteen Buddhas

Buddhist temples in Tokushima Prefecture
Buddhist pilgrimage sites in Japan